The Basketball Federation of Montenegro (Montenegrin: Košarkaški Savez Crne Gore, KSCG / Кошаркашки Савез Црне Горе, КСЦГ), is the governing body of basketball in Montenegro. It operates the top-level Opportunity League for men's clubs.

History
In 2003, the federation became part of Serbia and Montenegro's basketball federation. On August 27, 2006, the Basketball Federation of Montenegro along with the Montenegro's national team joined the International Basketball Federation (FIBA) on its own after Montenegro achieved its independence from Serbia and Montenegro on June 3, 2006.

See also
Montenegro national basketball team
Sport in Montenegro
 Želimir Cerović

External links
Official Website of the Basketball Federation of Montenegro (KSCG) 

Mon
Basketball in Montenegro
Basketball
Sports organizations established in 1955
1955 establishments in Montenegro